WACG-FM (90.7 FM) is a radio station licensed to Augusta, Georgia. The station is owned by Georgia Public Broadcasting, and is an affiliate of GPB's radio network. WACG-FM began broadcasting June 2, 1970, and was originally owned by Augusta College.

References

External links
gpb.org

ACG-FM
NPR member stations
Radio stations established in 1970
1970 establishments in Georgia (U.S. state)